Byron is an English toponymic surname that is derived from Byram, North Yorkshire. Its use as a given name derives from the surname.

Surname 
Beverly Byron (b. 1932), U.S. Congresswoman, widow of Goodloe Byron
David Byron (1947-1985), 20th-century British musician, former singer of Uriah Heep
Delma Byron (1913-2006), American actress
Don Byron (b. 1958), American jazz (or eclectic) composer and musician
Fergal Byron (b. 1974), Irish Gaelic football player
Frederick Byron, 10th Baron Byron (1861–1949), Anglican clergyman and British peer
George Byron, 7th Baron Byron (1789–1868), British naval officer, cousin of poet George Gordon Byron
George Byron, 8th Baron Byron (1818-1870), 19th-century British army officer and peer
George Byron, 9th Baron Byron (1855–1917), British army officer and peer
Lord Byron (George Gordon Byron, 6th Baron Byron) (1788–1824), English writer and poet
Goodloe Byron, 20th-century U.S. Congressman
Henry James Byron, 19th-century British dramatist
John Byron, 1st Baron Byron, 17th-century Royalist
 Vice-Admiral John Byron, 18th-century British explorer
John Byron (died 1623), 16th-century English knight, father of 1st Baron Byron
John Byron (died 1600), 16th-century English knight, grandfather of 1st Baron Byron
 Captain John "Mad Jack" Byron, 18th-century British army officer, descendant of 2nd Baron and father of poet George Gordon Byron
Judy Byron, American artist
Kari Byron, member of the MythBusters crew
Katharine Byron, 20th century U.S. Congresswoman, widow of William D. Byron
 Sir Nicolas Byron, 16th-century English knight, great-grandfather of 1st Baron Byron
 Paul Byron (b. 1989), Canadian ice hockey player
 Lt.Col. Richard Byron, 12th Baron Byron DSO, 20th-century British army officer and peer
 Sir Richard Byron, 2nd Baron Byron, 17th-century Royalist, knight, brother of 1st Baron
 Rear-admiral Richard Byron (Royal Navy officer) (1769–1837)
Robert Byron, 20th-century British travel writer
Robert Byron, 13th Baron Byron, British barrister and peer
Robert "Red" Byron, 20th-century NASCAR driver
Rupert Byron, 11th Baron Byron, 20th-century Australian peer
Tanya Byron, British psychologist
Tom Byron, American pornographic actor and director
William Byron, American race car driver
William Byron, 3rd Baron Byron, 17th-century British peer and great-great-great-uncle of poet George Gordon Byron
William Byron, 4th Baron Byron (1669–1736), British peer and great-great-uncle of poet George Gordon Byron
William Byron, 5th Baron Byron, 18th-century British peer called the "Wicked Lord", great-uncle of poet George Gordon Byron
William D. Byron, 20th-century U.S. Congressman
 Rev. William J. Byron, priest of the Society of Jesus

Given name 
Byron Adams, American composer
Byron Allen, American comic and television personality
Byron G. Allen, American politician
Byron Alvarez, Mexican football player
Byron Andrews, American journalist
Byron Anthony, Welsh football (soccer) player
Byron Baer, American politician
Byron Bailey, American football player
Byron Barr, American actor
Byron Barrera, Guatemalan journalist
Byron Barton, American author
Byron Barwig, American politician
Byron W. Bender, American professor
Byron Daniel Bernstein (1989–2020), Israeli-American streamer and esports player, known as Reckful
Byron Black, Zimbabwean tennis player
Byron B. Brainard, American electrician
Byron Brown, Mayor of Buffalo, New York
Byron Buxton, MLB outfielder
Byron Cage, American gospel singer
Byron Chamberlain, American NFL tight end
Byron Cherry, American actor, businessman, entrepreneur
Byron Lavoy Cockrell, American rocket scientist
Byron Cook, American politician
Byron Cowart (born 1996), American football player
Byron M. Cutcheon, American politician
Byron Dafoe, ice hockey goaltender
Byron W. Dickson, American football player
Byron Dorgan, U.S. Senator
Byron H. Dunbar, American attorney
Byron Eby, American football player
Byron Fidetzis, Greek cellist and conductor
Byron Foulger, American actor
Byron B. Harlan, American attorney
Byron G. Harlan, American singer
Byron Haskin, U.S. film director
Byron G. Highland, American photographer
Byron O. House, American jurist
Byron Howard, U.S. film director, producer, screenwriter, story artist and animator
Byron E. Hyatt, American mayor
Byron F. Johnson, American officer
Byron L. Johnson, American economist
Byron Jones, American NFL safety
Byron M. Jones, Christian film producer
Byron Q. Jones, American aviator
Byron Katie, American self-help author and founder of "The Work"
Byron Keith, American actor
Byron Kelleher, New Zealand rugby player
Byron Krieger, American fencer
Byron Barnard Lamont, Australian botanist and professor
Byron Larkin, American basketball player
Byron Lee, Jamaican musician and record producer
Byron Lee, American NFL linebacker
Byron Leftwich, American NFL quarterback
Byron K. Lichtenberg, American astronaut
Byron Mann, American actor
Byron J. Matthews, American politician
Byron Maxwell, American NFL cornerback
Byron E. Morgan, American football coach
Byron Murphy (born 1998), American football player
Byron Nelson, PGA Tour golfer
Byron R. Newton, American journalist
Byron C. Ostby, American politician
Byron S. Payne, American attorney
Byron Root Pierce, American dentist
Byron W. Preston, American justice
Byron Pringle, American football player
Byron B. Randolph, Democratic president
Byron F. Ritchie, Canadian ice hockey player
Byron Roberts, Black metal artist, nicknamed 'Lord Byron'
Byron G. Rogers, U.S. representative
Byron Scott, American NBA coach and former player
Byron N. Scott, American lawyer
Byron Sharp, Australian professor of marketing
Byron D. Shear, American politician
Byron Sher, American politician
Byron Smith, convicted American killer
Byron G. Stout, American politician
Byron A. Stover, American politician
Byron Stroud, bassist for metal bands Fear Factory, Zimmers Hole and City of Fire
Byron Tenorio, Ecuadorian football (soccer) player
Byron M. Tunnell, American attorney
Byron Velvick, professional bass fisherman and bachelor for Season 6 of the United States television show The Bachelor
Byron F. Wackett, American politician
Byron White, American football player, later Associate Justice of the Supreme Court of the United States
Byron Wien, American investor and author
Byron August Wilson, American artist
Byron York, American conservative
Byron Young (born 1998), American football player

Fictional characters 
Byron Basset, the sleeping puppy from Tiny Toon Adventures
Byron (Babylon 5), a character from the television series Babylon 5
Byron (Pokémon), a character of the Pokémon universe
Byron "Buster" Bluth, a character from the comedic television series Arrested Development
Byron Hadley, the sadistic prison captain from The Shawshank Redemption
Byron Montgomery, a character from the television series and teen novels Pretty Little Liars
Byron the Bulb, a long-burning light-bulb from Thomas Pynchon's novel Gravity's Rainbow
Byron Orpheus, character in adult swim series The Venture Brothers
 Byron Sully, main character in series Dr. Quinn, Medicine Woman
 Byron Ellington, talked about character in series White Collar

See also 
Bayron Piedra, Ecuadorian athlete
 
 
Biram (disambiguation), a variant spelling
Biron (surname), a variant spelling
Biron (disambiguation)
Bryon, a given name
Byram (surname), a variant spelling
Byrom, a variant spelling
Byrum (surname), a variant spelling

References 

English-language surnames
English masculine given names
English toponymic surnames